Smolensk Province was a province of Riga Governorate, Russian Empire.

The province was created in 1713 when Smolensk Governorate was abolished with its territory divided between Moscow and Riga Governorates.  The province was abolished in 1726, when Smolensk Governorate was re-instated.

Subdivisions of the Russian Empire
States and territories established in 1713
1726 disestablishments
1713 establishments in Russia